Selim Bengriba (born 24 September 1980) is a French former professional footballer who is best known for his career with Grenoble as a defender.

Career
Bengriba began football at the age of 11 with Grenoble, and spent most of his footballing career in amateur leagues. As an amateur footballer, he had jobs as a solderer, in his local town hall, and with Caterpillar Inc. In 2011, he returned to his childhood Grenoble after they filed for bankruptcy and was tasked with bringing them back up. In 2014, he gained the captain armband at the age of 33. He managed to promote Grenoble back to Ligue 2 in 2018, after one year in the Championnat National. Bengriba signed his first professional contract with Grenoble on 13 June 2018, at the age of 37.

Bengriba made his professional debut for Grenoble in a 2–1 Coupe de la Ligue loss to Metz on 14 August 2018.

Personal life
Born in France, Bengriba is of Tunisian descent.

References

External links
 
 
 Foot National Profile
 
 GF38 Profile

1980 births
Living people
Sportspeople from Dijon
French footballers
French sportspeople of Tunisian descent
Association football defenders
Grenoble Foot 38 players
Bourges 18 players
Ligue 2 players
Championnat National players
Championnat National 2 players
Championnat National 3 players
Chambéry SF players
Footballers from Bourgogne-Franche-Comté
20th-century French people
21st-century French people